Lift Powder, or Lift Charge is a slang term for Gunpowder. The term "Lift Powder" is mostly used in the Fireworks Industry.

References

Pyrotechnic compositions